Joseph Brooks, born Joseph Kaplan (March 11, 1938 – May 22, 2011), was an American composer, director, producer, and screenwriter. He was a prolific writer of advertising jingles and wrote the hit songs "My Ship Is Comin' In", "If Ever I See You Again", and "You Light Up My Life", the last for the hit film of the same name that he also wrote, directed, and produced. In his later years he became the subject of an investigation after being accused of a series of casting-couch rapes. He was indicted in 2009, but killed himself on May 22, 2011, before his trial.

Early life and singing career
Brooks was born Joseph Kaplan on March 11, 1938 in Manhattan, and grew up in Manhattan and Lawrence, Long Island, New York. In later interviews, he claimed to have started playing piano at age 3 and writing plays at age 5, following his parents' divorce. As a child, he also developed a stutter that, according to his production partner Robert K. Lifton, would disappear when Brooks sang or acted. He later attended five different colleges, including Juilliard, but did not graduate from any.

In the late 1950s, Brooks pursued a career as a singer-songwriter, adopting the name "Joey Brooks" (later changed to "Joe Brooks" or "Joseph Brooks") He released several records on the Canadian-American label as "Joey Brooks", and on Decca as "Joey Brooks and the Baroque Folk". When his singing career failed, he drifted into advertising and occasional songwriting work, although he sporadically released several more records throughout the 1960s and 1970s.

Advertising, film and stage career
In the 1960s, Brooks composed advertising jingles for clients including Pepsi ("You've Got a Lot to Live") and Maxwell House ("Good to the Last Drop Feeling"). He received numerous Clio Awards for his work, as well as a People's Choice Award. Credited as "Joey Brooks", he also wrote the song "My Ship Is Comin' In", a Top Ten UK hit in 1966 for the Walker Brothers.

In the 1970s, Brooks, who had become wealthy from his advertising work (at one point claiming to have 150 commercials on the air), began composing for films. He wrote music for the American release of The Garden of the Finzi-Continis (1970), Marjoe (1972), and The Lords of Flatbush (1974) in which he was also an investor. He wrote "Blue Balloon (The Hourglass Song)" which was sung by Robby Benson as the theme song for the film Jeremy (1973), and further claimed to have written, cast and directed most of Jeremy, although Arthur Barron was the sole writer and director of record. Brooks' claim was recognized by New York Times film critic Roger Greenspun, who wrote that "it seems fair to suggest that, in whatever proportion, both men were involved in the authorship of the film."

Brooks next developed his own film project, You Light Up My Life, which he wrote, produced, directed and scored on a budget of approximately $1 million. The romantic drama about an aspiring singer, starring Didi Conn, became a box office success despite poor reviews. The title song Brooks composed for the film was an even bigger success; a cover version by Debby Boone reached #1 on the U.S. Billboard Hot 100 chart and held the top position for 10 consecutive weeks, at that time tied for the longest Number One reign in the chart's history.  With sales of over five million copies, the song ultimately became the biggest hit of the 1970s, and earned Brooks a Grammy Award for Song of the Year, an Academy Award for Best Original Song, a Golden Globe Award and an American Society of Composers, Authors and Publishers (ASCAP) award.

Brooks attempted to follow up his success with a similar romantic drama, If Ever I See You Again (1978), for which Brooks not only co-wrote, produced, directed and scored, but also played the leading role (a successful composer of TV commercial jingles, much like himself in real life), despite having no significant prior acting experience. Although the title song became a moderate hit for  Roberta Flack, peaking at #24 on the Hot 100 chart, the movie received sharply negative reviews and was a box-office bomb. Brooks was subsequently involved in several other films, including directing and scoring Invitation to the Wedding (1983) in which Ralph Richardson and John Gielgud appeared, and co-producing Eddie and the Cruisers (1983) (which Brooks did not score). In the late 1990s, he and his then-wife Christina Bone began developing a film entitled Sara's Life Before It Became a Movie, which was never released.

Brooks also worked on stage productions, composing and writing for the 1989 West End musical adaptation of Metropolis and writing, directing and producing the Broadway musical In My Life (2005), a love story about a female Village Voice personals editor with obsessive-compulsive disorder and a musician with Tourette's syndrome who are brought together by a jingle-singing God. Robert Simonson later wrote in Brooks' Playbill obituary that In My Life was "generally regarded as one of the strangest shows ever to have graced a Broadway stage." When In My Life was panned by critics including Ben Brantley of The New York Times, who called it "jaw-dropping moments of whimsy run amok", Brooks spent $1.5 million on ads saying that the critics were wrong.

Many sources have described Brooks as an egomaniac. His career was curtailed in 2008 by a stroke.

Sexual assault indictment
In June 2009, Brooks was arrested on charges of raping or sexually assaulting eleven women lured to his East Side apartment from 2005 to 2008. His female assistant, Shawni Lucier, was charged with helping him.

"She  picked  the  victims,  set  up  travel  arrangements  and  reassured  them,” said  Lisa  Friel,  chief  of  the  district  attorney's  sex  crimes  unit. At  times,  she  said,  Ms. And,  she  said,  Ms. Lucier  was  sometimes  present  in  the  apartment  when  the women arrived,  but  left  before  the  assaults. At least four of the women accused him of sexual assault. He allegedly lured the women to his apartment to audition for movie roles. According to Manhattan District Attorney Robert Morgenthau, the women responded to a notice that Brooks had posted on Craigslist seeking attractive women to star in movie roles, and flew to New York from Pacific Coast states or Florida, usually at Brooks' expense.

He was indicted on June 23, 2009.  He was to be tried in the state Supreme Court for Manhattan (a trial-level court) on 91 counts of rape, sexual abuse, criminal sexual act, assault, and other charges. In December 2009, prosecutors indicated that they would ask the grand jury to consider adding even more charges, in part because "additional victims" had come forward. However, Brooks committed suicide on May 22, 2011, before he could be tried.

Three days after Brooks' death, Shawni Lucier pleaded guilty to ten counts of criminal facilitation.

Personal life
Brooks was the older brother of Gilbert Kaplan, the founder of Institutional Investor magazine, aficionado of Gustav Mahler, and amateur conductor.

In 2008, Brooks suffered a stroke, which left him unable to play the piano and thus negatively affected his ability to compose. It was reported that he may have had a second stroke shortly before his death.

Brooks was married four times, but was single at the time of his death. A 1978 news article noted that he was married with 7-year-old twins, a boy and a girl. In the late 1970s, Brooks married Susan Paul, an English model and actress who appeared in the films All That Jazz (1979) and Invitation to the Wedding (1983). They had two children during the 1980s and were divorced in the early 1990s. Brooks later married Christina Bone.

In 1975, Brooks had a relationship with actress Cindy Williams, who was, at the time, starring in the movie, The First Nudie Musical, written and co-directed by her friend Bruce Kimmel. Brooks became an investor in the film.  Brooks originally planned for her to star in You Light Up My Life, but he and Williams were already having relationship issues and he asked Kimmel to direct You Light Up My Life, stating he couldn't control Williams. He broke up with Williams before the film was made, and the role went to Didi Conn. In 2009, Brooks sued a 22-year-old ex-fiancée, claiming that he had spent $2 million on her before learning she was already married.

Brooks had four children: Amanda (born 1981) and Nicholas (born 1986) (both from his marriage to Susan Paul), Gabrielle, and Jeffrey. Brooks' daughter Amanda has said that Brooks abused her as a child and that she and Nicholas had a difficult relationship with their father. At the time of Brooks' death, Nicholas, a former student at the University of Colorado, was awaiting trial in New York City, charged with the murder of his girlfriend, swimwear designer Sylvie Cachay, in a Soho House hotel room on December 9, 2010. On July 11, 2013, Nicholas was convicted of Cachay's murder. He was sentenced to 25 years to life in prison in September of that year.

Death
On May 22, 2011, Brooks was found dead in his apartment on the Upper East Side of Manhattan, with a plastic bag over his head near a hose attached to a helium tank. A suicide note was located nearby. According to a law enforcement source, Brooks claimed in the note he would be exonerated of the charges pending against him, but complained about his failing health and a woman who he claimed had abused him and taken his money.

Shortly before Brooks' death, a former friend had also filed suit to seize his condominium to pay off an outstanding $3.2 million debt, alleging that Brooks had put up his longtime home as collateral for a $2.4 million loan in 2006.

On May 23, 2011, the medical examiner ruled that Brooks had killed himself, citing asphyxia by helium.

Partial list of credits

Film
 The Lords of Flatbush (1974) – Conductor, music arranger
 You Light Up My Life (1977) – Producer, director, writer and composer (1977)
 If Ever I See You Again (1978) – Producer, director, co-writer, composer and actor (1978)
 Headin' for Broadway (1980) – Director, co-writer
 Eddie and the Cruisers (1983) -- Producer
 Invitation to the Wedding (1985) – Director

Stage
 Metropolis (1989), West End musical – Composer, co-lyricist
 In My Life (2005), Broadway musical – Director, writer, composer and lyricist

See also 
 Grammy Award for Song of the Year
 Academy Award for Best Original Song
 You Light Up My Life (song)

References

Sources
 Press, Jaques Cattell (Ed.). ASCAP Biographical Dictionary of Composers, Authors and Publishers, fourth edition, R. R. Bowker, 1980.

External links
 
 

1938 births
2011 deaths
2011 suicides
20th-century American male writers
20th-century American screenwriters
21st-century American male writers
21st-century American screenwriters
American male screenwriters
Best Original Song Academy Award-winning songwriters
Film directors from New York City
Film producers from New York (state)
Golden Globe Award-winning musicians
Jewish American screenwriters
Jewish American songwriters
Jingle composers
Musicians from New York City
People from Manhattan
People from the Upper East Side
Screenwriters from New York (state)
Suicides by asphyxiation
Suicides in New York City
21st-century American Jews